The County of Dannenberg was a fief in the Duchy of Saxony. Its heartland was largely identical with the present-day collective municipality of Elbtalaue in north Germany.

Its historical origins go back to the middle of the 12th century, when Henry the Lion founded the five counties of  Holstein, Ratzeburg, Schwerin, Dannenberg and Lüchow during the Ostsiedlung, or colonisation of the East, from the mouth of the River Elbe to the southern border of the March of Brandenburg, in order to protect the new regions and borders of his territory.

The County of Dannenberg is first mentioned in the records in 1153; its first count, until 1169, was Volrad I of Dannenberg. He came from a noble family, the Edlers of Salzwedel. The county lasted until 1303, when the last count, Nicholas of Dannenberg, relinquished all his rights between the Elbe and Jeetzel rivers to Duke Otto the Strict, and it is finally mentioned in the records in 1311.

History 

At that time farmers, craftsmen and artisans settled around the county castle and the village of Dannenberg emerged, although the name Dannenberg had existed previously. From 1223 to 1225 King Valdemar II of Denmark and his son were imprisoned by the count in the castle tower (Valdemar Tower), still preserved today, after Henry of Schwerin had brought them here. In 1303 the last count, Nicholas, ceded the county for an annuity of 40 marks to the Duke of Brunswick and Lüneburg, Otto the Strict. From that time the former county belonged to the Principality of Lüneburg. In 1306 the Dannenberg line died out. At the beginning of the 15th century Dannenberg was split off again as a form of compensation for the new line, but the reigning duke in Celle retained specific sovereign rights.

Coats of arms 
The coat of arms of the County of Dannenberg was emblazoned with lions rampart, sometimes separate, sometimes as a facing pair. Sometimes they were also accompanied by a fir tree.

The earliest known county seal that has been preserved shows a right-facing lion rampant and dates to the year  1215. It belonged to Volrad II. Whether this symbol is meant to indicate the relationship of the county to Henry the Lion is not clear. The upright lion is depicted as a charge in all coats of arms, which was constantly changed by the counts to distinguish between themselves. A fir tree as a further figure was added by Adolf I, Count of Dannenberg from 1245. Two facing lions were first depicted in the seal of Bernard II, Count of Dannenberg about 1283–1293.

The symbols of the counts of Dannenberg have been preserved to this day. Lions and fir trees form part of the coats of arms of the town of Dannenberg (Elbe), the former Dannenberg (Elbe) collective municipality and the former district of Dannenberg. The coats of arms of the district of Lüchow-Dannenberg show a fir tree next to the three lozenges of the old County of Lüchow.

Family tree 
 Volrad I, from the House of Edler from Salzwedel, brother of Frederick of Salzwedel, first Count of Dannenberg, recorded as Count of Dannenberg 1153–1166, but probably ruled 1145–1169
 Henry I, 1169–1209 Count of Dannenberg
 Volrad II, probably died in 1226 in battle against Valdemar II near Rendsburg, 1207–1226 Count of Dannenberg; married Jutta of Wölpe, third daughter of Count Bernard II of Wölpe
 Henry III, 1233–1237 Count of Dannenberg
 Henry II, 1203–1236 Count of Dannenberg; married daughter of Adolf III of Holstein
 Bernard I, probably died 1266/67, in 1276 recorded as dead, 1227–1266 Count of Dannenberg; married the Countess of Schwerin
 Henry V, died before 1303, also described as Count of Grabow, Count of Dannenberg about 1273–75
 Adolf II, died before 1303, also described as Count of Dömitz, Count of Dannenberg about 1273
 Volrad IV, last recorded mention 1306
 John, died before 1306
 son
 Bernard II, died before 1303, Count of Dannenberg about 1283–1293
 Gunzel
 Nicholas, Count of Dannenberg about 1289–1303, last Count of Dannenberg 1303, last recorded mention 1311
 daughter; married John Gans zu Putlitz
 Adolf I, died 1266/67, 1245–1266 Count of Dannenberg; married Matilda who died about 1259
 Volrad III
 Frederick, Count of Dannenberg about 1274–1285
 Bernard III
 daughter; married Helmhold III of Schwerin
 Matilda, nun in St. Lorenz Abbey, Magdeburg
 daughter
 Henry IV, canon
 Gerburge
 Sophia

References 
Most of the information in this article comes from Geschichte der Grafen von Ratzeburg und Dannenberg (Meyer (1911) below). In addition, the following references are used:

Sources 
  Meyer, Dr. Wilhelm (1911). Geschichte der Grafen von Ratzeburg und Dannenberg, Schwerin, 1911. In: Jahrbuch des Vereins für Mecklenburgische Geschichte und Altertumskunde. Vol. 76. Bärensprungsche Hofbuchdruckerei, Schwerin, 1911.
 Wachter, Berndt (1983). Aus Dannenberg und seiner Geschichte, 2nd edition, Becker Verlag, Uelzen, 1983.

Counties of the Holy Roman Empire
Former states and territories of Lower Saxony
Former states and territories of Mecklenburg-Western Pomerania
Duchy of Saxony
Medieval Germany